Saleh Al-Saqri (born 23 January 1979) is a retired Saudi Arabian footballer who played as a defender for Al-Tai, Al-Ittihad and Al-Etiffaq. He also played for the Saudi Arabia national team.

Al-Saqri played for Saudi Arabia at the 1999 FIFA World Youth Championship in Nigeria.

Honours
Al-Ittihad
Saudi Professional League: 1999–2000, 2000–01, 2002–03, 2006–07, 2008–09
King Cup: 2010
Crown Prince Cup: 2001, 2004
Saudi-Egyptian Super Cup: 2001, 2003
AFC Champions League: 2004, 2005
Asian Cup Winners' Cup: 1998–99
Arab Champions League: 2004–05

Saudi Arabia
Arabian Gulf Cup: 2002
Arab Cup: 2002

References

External Links

1979 births
Living people
People from Ha'il
Saudi Arabian footballers
Saudi Arabia international footballers
2000 AFC Asian Cup players
Al-Tai FC players
Ittihad FC players
Ettifaq FC players
Saudi Professional League players
Association football defenders